This is a list of Latvian football transfers in the 2010 summer transfer window by club. Only transfers of the Latvian Higher League are included.

All transfers mentioned are shown in the external links at the bottom of the page. If you want to insert a transfer that isn't shown there, please add a reference.

Latvian Higher League

SK Liepājas Metalurgs 

In:

Out:

FK Ventspils 

In:

Out:

Skonto FC 

In:

Out:

FK Jūrmala-VV 

In:

Out:

JFK Olimps/RFS 

In:

Out:

SK Blāzma 

In:

Out:

FC Tranzit 

In:

Out:

FK Jelgava 

In:

Out:

FK Jaunība 

In:

Out:

FC Daugava 

In:

Out:

External links 
 Official site of Latvian Football Federation 
 Soccerway.com 

2010
Latvia
Football
transfers